Janusz Konrad Dobrosz (born 7 March 1954 in Wieruszów) is a Polish politician. He was elected to the Sejm on 25 September 2005, getting 14,655 votes in 3 Wrocław district as a candidate from the  League of Polish Families list.

He was also a member of People's Republic of Poland Sejm 1989-1991, Sejm 1993-1997, Sejm 1997-2001, and Sejm 2001-2005.

See also
Members of Polish Sejm 2005-2007

External links
Janusz Dobrosz - parliamentary page - includes declarations of interest, voting record, and transcripts of speeches.

1954 births
Living people
People from Wieruszów
League of Polish Families politicians
Deputy Marshals of the Sejm of the Third Polish Republic
Members of the Polish Sejm 2005–2007
Members of the Polish Sejm 1993–1997
Members of the Polish Sejm 1997–2001
Members of the Polish Sejm 2001–2005